Paul Foster (born 28 December 1967) is an Australian former football (soccer) player. His younger brother Craig Foster is a former Australian international.

Playing career
Playing as a striker, Foster debuted with South Melbourne FC before playing with Sunshine George Cross in the National Soccer League (NSL). He also played for Avala. In 1994, Foster moved to Kitchee SC in Hong Kong before moving on a free transfer to Instant Dict FC. He came back to Australia and played for Northern Spirit FC and Brisbane Strikers in the National Soccer League (NSL).

Honours
Hong Kong First Division League
Top Scorer:1995–96,1996–97,1997–98

References

1967 births
Living people
Sportsmen from New South Wales
Soccer players from New South Wales
Australian soccer players
Association football forwards
National Soccer League (Australia) players
Brisbane Strikers FC players
Northern Spirit FC players
South Melbourne FC players
Caroline Springs George Cross FC players
Bonnyrigg White Eagles FC players
Expatriate footballers in Hong Kong
Hong Kong First Division League players
Kitchee SC players
Double Flower FA players
Hong Kong League XI representative players